Qeshlaq-e Beznabad (also Romanized as Qeshlāq-e Beznābād; also known as Qeshlāq) is a village in Cham Chamal Rural District, Bisotun District, Harsin County, Kermanshah Province, Iran. At the 2006 census, its population was 64, in 13 families.

References 

Populated places in Harsin County